Mount Trimpi is a mountain 3 nautical miles (6 km) west-northwest of Mount Brice in the Behrendt Mountains, Palmer Land. Mapped by United States Geological Survey (USGS) from surveys and U.S. Navy air photos, 1961–67. Named by Advisory Committee on Antarctic Names (US-ACAN) for Michael L. Trimpi, radioscience researcher at Eights Station in 1963.

Mountains of Palmer Land